The  is a former baseball stadium in Japan. It was considered to be a tiny stadium that fit 20-30 thousand people. The Nippon League Taiyo Whales played there. It was used by the Whales from 1950 to 1952.

References

Defunct baseball venues in Japan
Shimonoseki
Sports venues in Yamaguchi Prefecture